Zygmunt Gorgolewski (14 February 1845 in Solec – 6 July 1903 in Lviv) was a Polish architect, renowned for his construction of the Grand Theatre in Lviv.

Life and career 
Gorgolewski was born in Solec (Schulitz), Grand Duchy of Posen, Kingdom of Prussia. Between 1866 and 1871 he studied in Berlin at the Royal Building Academy. During his studies, Gorgolewski also supervised the construction of Lehrte Train Station in Berlin. After graduating, for six years he worked as an assistant in his alma mater. After that he became an advisor at the Prussian Ministry of Public Works, official royal palace architect and architecture inspector (Königlicher Regierungsbaumeister) in Halle upon Saale. Gorgolewski was one of the most notable supporters of historicism in architecture in the Kingdom of Prussia and then the German Empire.

Among his projects were two versions of the future Reichstag building, which he proposed in 1872 and then in 1882. His projects were among merely 20 chosen by the committee out of more than 100. However, in the end his ideas for these projects were refused. At the same time, Gorgolewski was awarded with the construction of Kaiser Wilhelm's Bridge. Other, more successful, projects include the plans of refurbishment of royal palaces in Berlin and in Kiel, expansion of University Hospitals in Halle upon Saale and Bonn, the Bathhouse IV (1883-1885, now numbered II) of Bad Oeynhausen spa in Westphalia. In addition, he contributed plans for the projected new construction of the Berlin Supreme Parish and Collegiate Church, and worked on renovating Bellevue Palace, and created as main architect courthouses in Opole (Oppeln) and Olsztyn (Allenstein), as well as prisons in Świdnica (Schweidnitz) and Chorzów (Königshütte).

In the Greater Poland region, Gorgolewski conducted the construction of many notable palaces both in and around Poznań. His works include:
 refurbishment of a church in Września
 refurbishment of Działyński family palace in Gołuchów
 refurbishment of Działyński family library in Kórnik
 construction of Twardowski family palace in Kobylniki
 enlargement of Kwilecki palace in Oporów
 Radziwiłł family romantic castle Bagatela near Ostrów Wielkopolski
 construction of a new church tower as well as a Czapski family chapel in Smogulec
 construction of the headquarters of the Poznań Society of Friends of Arts and Sciences (1874–79), as well as houses in Berlińska street in front of it.

He was also appointed as the main architect of the refurbishment of the palace of Ferdynand Radziwiłł in Ołyka, Volhynia. During his stay there, Gorgolewski for the first time visited Vilnius, Kraków, Kyiv and Lviv. The latter city enjoyed a period of fast expansion and in 1875 Gorgolewski took part in the contest for the project of the future Diet of Galicia and Lodomeria. His project was the most disputed and highly praised, but it was finally turned down, mostly due to financial reasons.

In 1879, Gorgolewski married Helena née Hulewicz. He was also an active member of many architectural juries across partitioned Poland. Among others, he was the member of the jury during the contest for the project of Kraków Old Theatre (1889), the bank in Czerniowce and Church of St. Elizabeth in Lviv. In 1893 he moved to Lviv, where he was chosen as the main architect of the Grand Theatre (1897–1900). To avoid being accused of using his well-established position in society, Gorgolewski prepared his winning project of the theatre in secret and then sent it under a false name from Leipzig. Other notable building of his authorship was the Industrial School in the same city. In 1894, he was a member of a team of architects supervising the construction of over 100 pavilions for the General National Exhibition in Lviv.

Gorgolewski died in Lviv and was buried in the Lychakiv Cemetery.

Gallery

See also
History of Lviv
Teodor Talowski

References 

1845 births
1903 deaths
People from Bydgoszcz County
19th-century Polish architects
People from the Province of Posen
Architects from Lviv
Burials at Lychakiv Cemetery